Shihjia is a station on the Red line of Kaohsiung MRT in Cianjhen District, Kaohsiung, Taiwan.

The station is a three-level, underground station with an island platform and four exits. It is 188 meters long and is located at the intersection of Jhongshan 3rd Rd. and Mincyuan 2nd Rd.

Around the station
 Carrefour Chenggong Store
 China Steel Corporation Headquarters
 Costco Kaohsiung Store
 IKEA Kaohsiung Store
 Labor Park
 Nanpu Power Plant

References

2008 establishments in Taiwan
Kaohsiung Metro Red line stations
Railway stations opened in 2008